Aquila Capital is an investment management company with headquarters in Hamburg, Germany. It was founded in 2001 and focuses on sustainable investments, including renewable energy and green logistics, as well as real estate. Aquila Capital manages more than €12.5 billion for institutional investors and is among Europe’s leading investment companies in clean energy.

History 
The company was founded in 2001 and began investing in agriculture and forestry, followed by hydropower (including storage), finally raising funds for solar and wind energy, as well as logistics and real estate. Since climate change is easy to predict due to CO2 emissions, the company focused exclusively on sustainable investments.

In 2016, Aquila Capital received public attention for launching a €500 million vehicle to invest in infrastructure assets and funds. It was open to both institutional and wealthy private investors. In 2018, Aquila Capital financed the expansion of European hydropower by entering a partnership with a Dutch pension investor. Furthermore, Aquila is investment adviser for the Aquila European Renewables Income Fund (AERIF), which raised €154.3 million during its initial public offering (IPO) in May 2020.

In 2018, the company received the Swedish Renewable Energy Award for its commitment to the transition to a low carbon society. Aquila Capital was named European Hedge Fund Firm of the Year in 2010 and 2012. Due to continued growth, the company ranks among the largest investment managers in Europe. As of today, the company’s main business units are renewable energy, real estate, energy efficiency, timber and agriculture.

Operations 
The company is part of Aquila Group, a holding for Aquila Capital, affiliated companies and brands.

Aquila Capital is managed by Roman Rosslenbroich (Chief Executive Officer) and Dieter Rentsch (Chief Investment Officer), both co-founders of Aquila Group. In 2019, the infrastructure arm of Daiwa Securities, a Japanese investment bank, acquired a 40 % stake of Aquila Capital. The company management is supported by an advisory board.

Activities 
Aquila Capital has invested more than three billion euros in solar assets and more than two billion in wind assets. All energy plants together provide a power capacity of currently 10 gigawatts, which is to be expanded to 75 gigawatts within ten years. The current operative portfolio corresponds to a CO2 avoidance of around 1.2 million tonnes annually, which equals to the emissions of around 70,000 households. Besides its own activities, Aquila Capital is initiator and shareholder of KlimaInvest Green Concepts, an energy and climate protection agency in Germany, which offsets carbon emissions on demand.

References

External links 
 

Companies based in Hamburg
Companies established in 2001
Financial services companies of Germany
Alternative investment management companies